Frederick Love Linay (27 July 1890 – 22 November 1974) was an Australian rules footballer who played with St Kilda in the Victorian Football League (VFL).

Notes

External links 

1890 births
1974 deaths
Australian rules footballers from Melbourne
St Kilda Football Club players
People from South Melbourne